Robert Lorne Stanfield  (April 11, 1914 – December 16, 2003) was a Canadian politician who served as the 17th premier of Nova Scotia from 1956 to 1967 and the leader of the Official Opposition and leader of the federal Progressive Conservative Party of Canada from 1967 to 1976.

Born into an affluent Nova Scotia clothing manufacturing and political family in Truro, Stanfield graduated from Dalhousie University and Harvard Law School in the 1930s. He was a lawyer before becoming the leader of the Nova Scotia Progressive Conservative Party in 1948, with the goal of reviving the party that did not have a single seat in the legislature. After a rebuilding period, Stanfield led the party to a majority government in 1956; their first victory since 1928. Carrying the party to four majorities in total, Stanfield's government is credited with modernizing the way the province delivered education and medical services.

In 1967, he resigned as premier and became the leader of the federal Progressive Conservative (PC) Party, thus becoming the leader of the Official Opposition. In the 1968 federal election, he suffered a landslide defeat to the incumbent Liberals led by Prime Minister Pierre Trudeau. In 1972, Stanfield recovered the PCs' standing and narrowly lost to Trudeau for a second time. In 1974, he lost to Trudeau's Liberals for a third time by a wide margin. Stanfield was a strong supporter of bilingualism, putting him at odds with some members of the PC Party. He resigned as leader in 1976 and from politics in 1979. In retirement, he lived mostly in Ottawa, and died there in 2003 from complications due to pneumonia. He is sometimes referred to as "the best prime minister Canada never had". As one of Canada's most distinguished and respected statesmen, he was one of only several people granted the style "The Right Honourable" who were not so entitled by virtue of an office held.

Early life (1913–1949)
Stanfield was born in Truro, Nova Scotia, the son of Sarah Emma (née Thomas) and entrepreneur Frank Stanfield, and was named after Robert Borden, a fellow Nova Scotian who was prime minister at the time. Stanfield's family owned Stanfield's Limited, a large textile company. Stanfield studied economics and political science at Dalhousie University and was awarded the Governor General's Silver Medal for achieving the highest standing when he graduated in 1936 with a Bachelor of Arts (BA) degree.

Stanfield then studied at Harvard Law School, where he was an honours student near the top of his class and the first Canadian editor of the Harvard Law Review. During his student days in the 1930s, he witnessed the poverty that the Great Depression produced, causing him to become interested in John Maynard Keynes's economic theories. Stanfield then considered himself a socialist. Over time, he was less attached to socialism, but its influence on him remained, as he was considered a Red Tory for his appreciation of the common good.

Provincial politics (1949–1967)

Stanfield decided to enter Nova Scotia politics. The Progressive Conservative Party of Nova Scotia (PC Party) was in poor shape and did not have a single seat in the legislature, while the Liberals dominated the province. In 1948, Stanfield was elected leader of the party, and began the process of reviving the party. In the 1949 election, the PCs won 8 seats and in 1953, they won 12. In the 1956 election, the PCs won a majority government, their first victory since 1928. This ended 23 years of Liberal rule.

Premier of Nova Scotia (1956–1967)

Known as "Honest Bob" for his straightforward manner, Stanfield served as premier of Nova Scotia, governing as a moderate and pragmatist. He led reforms on education, human rights, and health care. He led the PCs to three re-elections in 1960, 1963, and 1967, each time with larger majorities.

Economic policy

In 1957, Stanfield's government established the crown corporation Industrial Estates Limited (IEL) to attract new industry in Nova Scotia. By the time Stanfield left office in 1967, the IEL had invested $74 million into 25 new firms and created nearly 2,300 jobs in the province.

In 1963, Stanfield's government established the Nova Scotia Voluntary Planning Board to assist the minister of finance in creating measures to increase the rate of economic growth through voluntary economic planning.

Stanfield's government raised the limit on agricultural loans from $8,000 to $100,000. To aid livestock farmers in building a million dollar slaughterhouse, his government contributed three dollars for every dollar the farmers raised. His government also created a provincial parks system.

Stanfield's government introduced hospital insurance, as well as a provincial sales tax (also known as the Hospital Tax) to fund half of it (with the other half being funded by the federal government). The PST, which became effective on January 1, 1959, was initially 5 percent but was later raised to 7 percent. The PST applied to all goods and services except food and children's clothing.

Stanfield strongly opposed the Bell Telephone Company's takeover bid of Nova Scotia's Maritime Telegraph and Telephone Company (M.T. & T.) in 1966, arguing that a takeover would lead to sharp increases in the cost of the service. After the Bell declined to negotiate with his government within a five-day time frame, Stanfield called a special session in the legislature; during the session, the legislature passed a bill that prevented the Bell from taking control of M.T. & T., allowing the latter to remain in Nova Scotian control.

Human rights

Stanfield prioritized human rights, particularly for Black Nova Scotians. In 1959, Stanfield's government passed the Fair Accommodation Practices Act to protect against discrimination in public spaces. In 1962, Stanfield created and led the Interdepartmental Committee on Human Rights to support the work of Dr. William Oliver and other Black Nova Scotians. The year later, Stanfield's government codified and extended earlier legislation in the first Human Rights Act of 1963. In 1965, the Stanfield government established the Education fund for Negros and in 1967, created the Nova Scotia Human Rights Commission with Oliver.

Education policy

Stanfield's government increased funding for schools and training colleges. His government started to contribute funding towards universities beginning in 1960; between 1960 and 1967, the Stanfield government's contributions towards universities jumped from $250,000 to $25,000,000. His government also introduced a capital assistance program in which the government would fund up to 90 percent of the cost of university buildings. In addition, Stanfield's government improved French-language education in Nova Scotia by introducing French textbooks (previously, Nova Scotia schools only offered English textbooks) and expanding French-language education to Grade 12 (up from Grade 8).

Leader of the Official Opposition (1967–1976)

1967 Progressive Conservative leadership convention

In 1967, the federal Progressive Conservative Party was racked by disunity between supporters and opponents of the leadership of John Diefenbaker. Stanfield entered the campaign for the party leadership. With the help of his Nova Scotian advisors and PC Party President Dalton Camp, he was the favourite and won on the fifth ballot of the 1967 leadership convention.

1968 federal election

Stanfield brought the Progressive Conservatives high in the polls, prompting many to expect him to defeat the Liberal government of the aging Lester B. Pearson. In February 1968, Stanfield almost forced an election after defeating Pearson's government on a tax bill, leading to several days of confusion over whether or not this counted as a de facto motion of no confidence in the government. Ultimately, it was ruled by the Governor General, Roland Michener that it did not, and while Stanfield immediately called an explicit motion of no confidence in Pearson's government, it failed to pass after the New Democratic Party and Ralliement créditiste declined to support it.

Pearson would soon retire, prompting the Liberals to choose a new leader, Pierre Trudeau. Trudeau subsequently called an election for June 25. Trudeau was a charismatic public speaker, a strong performer on television, and provided the party with major credibility in Quebec. Stanfield's unilingualism and laconic speaking style contrasted poorly with the new Liberal leader. The election result showed the Liberals increased their support to form a strong majority government; the PCs under Stanfield suffered a moderate decline in popularity as their seat count was reduced to 72, down from 94. 

Political science professor Ron Dart described Stanfield's political philosophy in the 1968 election as a "sort of pink toryism".

In 1969, Stanfield voted in favor of Trudeau's Bill C-150, a bill that decriminalized homosexuality. Stanfield also expressed support for guaranteed annual income.

Internal disputes

While able to carry on as leader after his initial defeat, Stanfield faced a variety of problems within the federal PC caucus, most controversially his support of the Liberal Official Languages Act and official bilingualism, which threatened a caucus revolt led by the further right-wing faction of the party. Stanfield's support of bilingualism did not endear him to the conservative base during his political career, though he earned much respect for his stand after he retired.

1972 federal election

In the election of 1972, Stanfield's Tories campaigned on the public's perception that the Liberals were mismanaging the economy. Though the Liberals started high in the polls, Trudeau's popularity had worn off and they slumped due to a poor campaign. The Tories came within two seats of defeating the Liberal government. The Liberals dropped to a minority government and stayed in power for two years with support from David Lewis and the New Democratic Party.

The general election was expected to be close but Stanfield refused to sign the nomination papers of former Moncton mayor Leonard Jones; Jones had won the party nomination but he refused to support official bilingualism which was part of PC policy.

1974 federal election

In the 1974 election, Stanfield ran on a policy of wage and price controls to help inhibit the rapid inflation of the era. Trudeau mocked the idea, saying that one couldn't say, "Zap! You're frozen!" to the economy. Trudeau later wrote in his memoirs that Stanfield's platform allowed him to be sniped at from all directions.  Trudeau would implement the controls in 1975, drawing widespread criticism for the abrupt reversal.

During the campaign, on May 30, 1974, a photo by photojournalist Doug Ball showing Stanfield fumbling a football thrown by Geoffrey Stevens at a stopover in North Bay, Ontario, became one of the defining images of his career. To this day, Canadian political commentators still point to this incident as one of Canada's foremost examples of "image politics", because the photo was chosen for the front pages of newspapers across Canada even though many other photos of Stanfield catching the same football were also available.

The result for the election on July 8 showed the Liberals had boosted their support from a minority to a majority government, while the Progressive Conservatives' seat count dropped from 106 to 95. The Progressive Conservatives did well in the Atlantic provinces, and in the West, but Liberal support in Ontario and Quebec ensured a majority Liberal government, mostly at the expense of Lewis's NDP rather than Stanfield's Tories.

Retirement
Stanfield served as leader of the PCs and leader of the Loyal Opposition until 1976. He became renowned as a gentlemanly and civil man, but after three election defeats, he faced much criticism from inside the party, from members that felt he had continually failed to provide strong leadership against the Liberals. He resigned in 1976 and was succeeded by Joe Clark, who had a much more aggressive approach in his attacks on the Liberals. Stanfield retired from Parliament in the 1979 election which finally brought the Progressive Conservatives to power.

Later years (1976–2003)

After his retirement, Stanfield stayed out of politics until the constitutional debates, when he endorsed and campaigned for the Meech Lake Accord, the Charlottetown Accord, and free trade. He said that the Meech Lake Accord was a second chance to save Canada from disaster. "I'm not at all sure that I would want to live in a country that rejected Meech Lake," he said at the time. "It wouldn't be the Canada I grew up in. It wouldn't be the country with the values that I've loved during my life." Prime Minister Brian Mulroney wanted to appoint Stanfield as U.N. ambassador saying, "I tried to engage him further but he was leading a vigorous life and a very active life and he didn't want to change after a while."

From 1983 to 1987, Stanfield served as chairman of the Institute for Research on Public Policy. He also served as the first Canadian chairman of the Commonwealth Foundation from December 1986 to 1991.

Illness and death
In 1996, Stanfield suffered a debilitating stroke that left him severely disabled. He died on December 16, 2003, in Ottawa, from pneumonia, only nine days after the Progressive Conservative Party merged with the Canadian Alliance to form the new Conservative Party of Canada. Fellow Nova Scotian — and final PC Party Leader — Peter MacKay suggested in an interview on CBC Newsworld's December 17, 2003 Morning Show that he had not personally spoken to Stanfield in regard to his opinions on the merger. It is unknown what Stanfield thought of the creation of the new Conservatives. His funeral service was held in Ottawa, and then he was buried in Camp Hill Cemetery, Halifax, Nova Scotia, next to his first wife Joyce Frazee, mother of his four children: Sarah, Max, Judith and Miriam, and with his second wife Mary Hall.

Personal life
Stanfield married Joyce Frazee in 1940, but she died in a car accident in 1954. During his term as premier, Stanfield remarried, exchanging vows with Mary Hall in 1957. Mary Stanfield died of cancer in 1977, and the following year, Stanfield married his third wife, Anne Austin. Anne Austin Stanfield died, age 89, April 22, 2021.

Honours
In July 1967, Stanfield and other provincial premiers were sworn into the Queen's Privy Council for Canada on the occasion of Canada's centennial.

On July 1, 1992, as part of Canada's 125th anniversary celebrations, the Queen on advice of Prime Minister Brian Mulroney granted Stanfield and six former cabinet ministers (Alvin Hamilton, Ellen Fairclough, Jack Pickersgill, Paul Martin Sr., Jean-Luc Pepin and Martial Asselin) the right to use the title "The Right Honourable".  He is one of nine Canadians entitled to the title without having held an office which such title is automatically conferred (the other two being former Deputy Prime Ministers Donald Mazankowski and Herb Gray).

In 2007, Halifax Robert L. Stanfield International Airport was named after him by Prime Minister Stephen Harper. He was also a Fellow of the Royal Canadian Geographical Society (FRCGS).

Honorary degrees
Robert Stanfield was awarded several honorary Degrees in recognition of His service to Canada, These Include

Honorary Degrees

Archives 
There is a Robert Stanfield fonds at Library and Archives Canada. Archival reference number is R4088.

Electoral record

Citations

References

External links
 Article on Stanfield and the Nova Scotia Tories.
 

1914 births
2003 deaths
Canadian Anglicans
Canadian King's Counsel
Dalhousie University alumni
Deaths from pneumonia in Ontario
Harvard Law School alumni
Lawyers in Nova Scotia
Leaders of the Opposition (Canada)
Members of the House of Commons of Canada from Nova Scotia
Members of the King's Privy Council for Canada
People from Truro, Nova Scotia
Premiers of Nova Scotia
Progressive Conservative Association of Nova Scotia MLAs
Progressive Conservative Party of Canada MPs
Royal Canadian Geographical Society fellows
Nova Scotia political party leaders
20th-century Canadian politicians